Albert Park is a suburb of Adelaide, South Australia. It is located in the City of Charles Sturt.

History
Named for Prince Albert, Albert Park was laid out in 1877 by a W.R. Cave. The suburb was advertised as:

Part of this site was subdivided in 1921 for residential development, and together with the aerodrome this land became the new suburb of Hendon. The aerodrome was compulsorily acquired by the Commonwealth in 1922 and operated until 1927, when aviation operations were transferred to Parafield.

The Aerodrome Post Office opened on 19 August 1925. It was renamed Aero Park in 1945 and Albert Park in 1967, before closing in 1987.

Geography
The suburb lies on the western side of the Port Road-West Lakes Boulevard intersection.

Demographics

The  by the Australian Bureau of Statistics counted 1,638 persons in Albert Park on census night. Of these, 48% were male and 52% were female.

The majority of residents (72.8%) are of Australian birth, with other common census responses being Italy (4.0%) and England (2.8%).

The age distribution of Albert Park residents is skewed slightly higher than the greater Australian population. 71.5% of residents were over 25 years in 2006, compared to the Australian average of 66.5%; and 28.5% were younger than 25 years, compared to the Australian average of 33.5%.

Politics

Local government
Albert Park is part of West Woodville Ward in the City of Charles Sturt local government area, being represented in that council by Tolley Wasylenko and Angela Keneally.

State and federal
Albert Park lies in the state electoral district of Cheltenham and the federal electoral division of Port Adelaide. The suburb is represented in the South Australian House of Assembly by Jay Weatherill and federally by Mark Butler.

Community

Schools
Our Lady Queen of Peace School is located on Botting Street

Transportation

Roads
Albert Park is serviced by Port Road, linking the suburb to Port Adelaide and Adelaide city centre, and West Lakes Boulevard, which connects Albert Park to the shopping facilities at West Lakes.

Public transport
Albert Park is serviced by public transport run by the Adelaide Metro.

Trains
The Grange railway line passes beside the suburb. The closest station is Albert Park.

Between 1940 and 1980, a further branch railway ran from Albert Park to a station within the industrial area of Hendon.

Buses
The suburb is serviced by bus routes run by the Adelaide Metro.

Trams
Albert Park was connected to Port Adelaide and other suburbs by tram lines. Tram services were later discontinued.

See also
 List of Adelaide suburbs

References

External links

Suburbs of Adelaide
Populated places established in 1877
1877 establishments in Australia